Waiting in the Wings is the second studio album by Swedish progressive metal band Seventh Wonder.
It is the first Seventh Wonder release to feature Tommy Karevik on vocals.

Track listing
"Star of David" - 5:13
"Taint the Sky" - 6:25
"Waiting in the Wings" - 9:18
"Banish the Wicked" - 5:36
"Not an Angel" - 6:45
"Devil's Inc." - 7:14
"Walking Tall" - 4:20
"The Edge of My Blade" - 6:32
"Pieces" - 4:31

Personnel
All information in the album booklet.

Seventh Wonder
Tommy Karevik – vocals, producer, engineering
Andreas Söderin – keyboard, producer, engineering
Johan Liefvendahl – guitar, producer, engineering
Andreas Blomqvist – bass, producer, engineering
Johnny Sandin – drums, producer, engineering

Additional musician
Jenny Karevik – additional vocals

Production
Carl-André Beckston – cover art, booklet design
Tommy Hansen – mixing, mastering
Daniel Flores – engineering
Patrik Forsberg – photography

References

2006 albums
Seventh Wonder albums